"Sexy Girl" is a song performed by Romanian dance-pop girl group Heaven featuring Romanian-Yemeni rapper Glance. Produced at Gala Records and featuring guest vocals by Glance.

The song was virtually released on March 29 without having its performer's name encrypted. Eventually "Sexy Girl" created a significant buzz on the internet and received favorable reactions from both the public and press. Two weeks later, Heaven admitted that the song belongs to them and started a promotional campaign.

The track has topped the Maltese and Cypriot charts for several weeks in summer 2010 and shortly after the band started touring the Mediterranean region. Furthermore, the song has become their most successful single in Romania, peaking in the top 10 on the national chart.

Considering the success "Sexy Girl" had, Heaven filmed an adjacent music video at the Romanian Academy in late may, 2010. The music video premiered on Libertateas official website on July 17.

Credits
Credits adapted from Gala Records's website.

Heavenlead vocals
Glancefeatured vocals
Gabriel Huibansongwriter, producer, backing vocals
Dan Deaconuproducer, keyboards, drums, bass, mixing, mastering
Alex Pelinsongwriter
Mihai Postolacheguitar

Charts

Weekly charts

Year-end charts

References

2010 singles
English-language Romanian songs
Dance-pop songs
2010 songs